West Georgia Technical College (WGTC) is a public community college in Waco, Georgia. It is part of the Technical College System of Georgia and provided education for a seven-county service area that includes Carroll, Coweta, Douglas, Haralson, Heard, Meriwether, and Troup.  WGTC is accredited by the Commission on Colleges of the Southern Association of Colleges and Schools (SACS) to award technical certificates of credit, diplomas, with associate degrees being the highest level of award for which the College has been accredited.

Campuses are located in Carrollton, Newnan, Douglasville, and Waco, Georgia, respectively.
These campuses were originally part of West Central Technical College (WCTC), based in Waco.  However, the name of the Troup campus in LaGrange was retained in the 2009 merger, one of several mergers in the TCSG.  Heard and Meriwether counties do not have full campuses but do have locations where classes are held.

Academics
West Georgia Technical College offers several types of courses:
 Technical education'' provide individuals with one of the following awards:
 Technical certificates of credit: typically last about six months to one year
 Diplomas: typically last about one to one and a half years
 degrees: typically last about two years.

 Adult education provide individuals one of the following awards:
 Adult Basic Education (ABE)
 Adult Secondary Education (ASE) toward completion of the GED
 English as a Second Language (ESL).

 Continuing education provides individuals with short-term non-credit training designed for personal and professional development and enrichment.
 Customized business and industry training provides employers with employer-specific training.

References

External links

Technical College System of Georgia
Education in Carroll County, Georgia
Education in Coweta County, Georgia
Education in Douglas County, Georgia
Education in Haralson County, Georgia
Education in Heard County, Georgia
Education in Meriwether County, Georgia
Education in Troup County, Georgia
Buildings and structures in Carroll County, Georgia
Buildings and structures in Coweta County, Georgia
Buildings and structures in Douglas County, Georgia
Buildings and structures in Haralson County, Georgia